Walter Lewis Hensley (September 3, 1871 – July 18, 1946) was a U.S. Representative from Missouri.

Born near Pevely, Missouri, Hensley attended the public schools and the law department of the University of Missouri.
He was admitted to the bar in 1894 and commenced practice in Wayne County, Missouri.
He moved to Bonne Terre, St. Francois County, Missouri, and continued the practice of law.
He served as prosecuting attorney of St. Francois County 1898-1902.
He moved to Farmington, Missouri, and practiced law.

Hensley was elected as a Democrat to the Sixty-second and to the three succeeding Congresses (March 4, 1911 – March 3, 1919). On April 5, 1917, he joined 49 other representatives in voting against declaring war on Germany.
He was not a candidate for renomination in 1918.
United States district attorney from March 1919 until he resigned in May 1920.
Reengaged in the private practice of law in St. Louis, Missouri, until 1936, when he retired and moved to near Pevely.
He died at his summer home in Ludington, Michigan, July 18, 1946.
He was interred in Sandy Baptist Cemetery, near Pevely, Missouri.

References

External links 
 

1871 births
1946 deaths
University of Missouri alumni
Democratic Party members of the United States House of Representatives from Missouri
People from Farmington, Missouri
United States Attorneys for the Eastern District of Missouri